Cambridge High School is a public high school in Cambridge, Nebraska.

Academics
55% of all students are proficient in math and 65% are proficient in reading. Cambridge Elementary and Middle School feed into Cambridge High School.

Demographics

References

External links

Public high schools in Nebraska
Cambridge, Nebraska